Fong Kui Lun (Pha̍k-fa-sṳ: Fông Kui-lùn; born 28 September 1946) is a Malaysian politician who has served as the Member of Parliament (MP) for Bukit Bintang since November 1999 and Klang from October 1990 to April 1995. He is a member of Democratic Action Party (DAP), a component party of the Pakatan Harapan (PH) and formerly Pakatan Rakyat (PR), Barisan Alternatif (BA) as well as Gagasan Rakyat (GR) coalitions. He also serves as the Treasurer-General of DAP.

Fong was first elected to Parliament in the 1990 election, for the seat of Klang. He lost the seat in the 1995 election, to Dr. Tan Yee Kew of the Malaysian Chinese Association (MCA). He returned to Parliament in 1999 election, winning the seat of Bukit Bintang, and became the DAP's treasurer in the same year. He was re-elected to Parliament in the consecutive 2004, 2008, 2013 and 2018 general elections.

In 2012, Fong apprehended a snatch thief attempting to escape in Pudu, Kuala Lumpur.

Election results

References

External links
Fong Kui Lun's blog

1946 births
People from Selangor
Living people
Malaysian politicians of Chinese descent
Democratic Action Party (Malaysia) politicians
Members of the Dewan Rakyat
21st-century Malaysian politicians